Crystal Lake is a mountain lake in Nevada County, California. It lies at an elevation of 5738 feet (1749 m). The lake resides on private property and is not open to the public.

References

Unincorporated communities in California
Unincorporated communities in Nevada County, California